The National Academy of Visual Arts and Architecture (НАОМА) - is an art university in Kyiv, Ukraine specialising in visual arts and architecture. It has departaments of painting, sculpture, illustration, graphic design, stage design, architecture, Art conservation, art management.

Name
 1917-1922 Ukrainian State Academy of Arts
 1922-1924 Institute of Plastic Arts
 1924-1930 Kyiv Art Institute (joined with the Ukrainian Institute of Architecture, 1918–1924)
 1930-1934 Kyiv Institute of Proletarian Art Culture
 1934-1992 All-Ukrainian Art Institute
 1992-1998 Ukrainian Academy of Arts
In 1996 in Kyiv was established Academy of Arts of Ukraine (AMU) as a learned society or national academy specialising in various type arts (i.e. visual, music, theatric, etc.).
 1998-2000 Academy of Visual Arts and Architecture
 2000–present National Academy of Visual Arts and Architecture

History

The National Academy of Fine Arts and Architecture (it should not be confused with the Ukrainian Academy of Arts) was founded as the Ukrainian State Academy of Arts at December 5, 1917 in Kyiv. The Founding Committee was headed by Pavlutsky with the initiative of the General Secretary of the Ministry of Education of the Ukrainian People's Republic I. Steshenko. The Statute of Academy was adopted by Central Rada at November 5 (18), 1917. The grand opening was held on 5 (18) December.

The Academy was headed by the Council of Academy composed from D. Antonovich, P. Zaitsev, D. Shcherbakovskaya (Scientific Secretary), and others. The first rector was Fedor Krichevsky.

The first professors of the Academy were: M. Boichuk (monumental art), N. Burachek (landscape), V. Krychevsky (architecture, composition), F. Krichevsky (painting, portrait), A. Manevich, O. Murashko, M. Zhuk (panel painting, drawing), H. Narbut (graphics). In 1921 a few new professores were included into Academy: L. Kramarenko (monumental and decorative painting), V. Meller (theater design), S. Nalepinska-Boichuk (engraving), E. Sagaidachny, B. Kratko (sculpture), A. Taran (mosaic) and others.

Initially, the Academy was located in the former Pedagogical Museum (Teacher's House) along with the Central Council of Ukraine, then it was transferred to the building of the former Tereshchenko's trade school. In February 1919, after the capture of Kyiv troops of the Red Army, Academy of Arts became a state organization with a research institute status. But in August 1919, after the capture of Kyiv Denikin's Volunteer Army, Ukrainian Academy of Arts has been credited to the not funded category. In addition the Academy has been expelled from its building, and all its belongings thrown into the attic. Rector of the Academy rented two unoccupied apartments in the same house at St. George's Lane, 11. These were placed painting studio, library and office.

In December 1920, after the restoration of Soviet regime in Kyiv, the Academy located in the former Noble Assembly building (stood in place of the building of Trade Unions on Krestchatyk). In 1922 Academy was reorganized and renamed to the Kyiv Institute of Plastic Arts. In 1924 Ukrainian Institute of Architecture was joined into one the Kyiv Arts Institute. The newly named Kyiv Arts Institute was located in a former building Kyiv Theological Seminary where it is located today. With new name were found new departments: film and photography, polygraphy, ceramics art and art political education teachers.

In a short time the Kyiv Arts Institute became one of the leading art schools of the Soviet Union. But in the late 1920s – early 1930s ideological infighting led to the downfall of its significance. In 1930 were closed the Publishing Department and a number of others. The rector Ivan Wrona was dismissed from his post and conducted a new reorganization of the university according to the Proletkult ideology. Now the institute was called as the Kyiv Institute of Proletarian Artistic Culture (see also Working class culture ) with original departments such as art and propaganda, decoration of proletarian life, the sculptural decoration of socialist cities, communist art education.

In 1934, after a fundamental reform of the institution, it was received a new name again. Now it was the All-Ukrainian Institute of Arts and then the Kyiv State Art Institute. At this period the Institut returned to academic education methods. As a result, the priority was given to Panel painting. After World War II the institute has grown considerably. The departments of the graphics, political poster, monumental theatrical decorative art, and later - the department of technology and art conservation (cultural heritage) reopened again. The department of theory and history of art was founded.

In 1992 by the Resolution of the Cabinet of Ministers of Ukraine the university returned to its original name - the All-Ukrainian Academy of Arts, and according to the decree of the Cabinet of Ministers of Ukraine dated March 17, 1998, it became The National Academy of Fine Arts and Architecture. 
By the decision of the State Accreditation Commission of Ukraine on July, 1997 Academy has IV accredited level, and on November, 1999 - certified.
In September 2000 of Presidential Decree Academy was granted the status of national institution as outstanding artistic education center for significant achievements in teaching and research activities, and for the preparation of the artistic and scientific-pedagogical personnel in the field of Fine Arts and Architecture Academy

Faculties and departments
Under the undergraduate program there are 3 faculties, 4 general and 10 faculty-tied departments. Two more departments are available for the post graduate degree (aspirantura). Before the Russian aggression against Ukraine in 2014, there was a Crimean branch (campus) of the university.

Undergraduate
 Faculty of Visual Arts and Restoration, the base school that traces its roots to the Ukrainian State Academy of Arts
 Department of Painting and Composition;
 Department of Graphic Arts;
 Department of Sculpture;
 Department of Technique and Restoration of Artwork (art conservation);
 Department of Scenography and Screen Arts;
 Department of Design.
 Faculty of Architecture
 Department of Architectural Design;
 Department of Theory and History of Architecture and Synthesis of Arts;
 Department of Architectural Structures.
 Faculty of Theory and History of Art
 Department of Theory and History of Arts.
 General academic departments
 Department of Drawing;
 Department of Culture and Social-Humanitarian Studies;
 Department of Foreign Languages;
 Department of Physical Education.

Graduate
Aspirantura
 Department of Visual Arts;
 Department of theory of architecture and conservation of monuments.

Rectors (directors)
 Fedir Krychevsky (1917-1918 and 1921–1923)
 Heorhiy Narbut (February 1918 - May 23, 1920)
 Mykhailo Boichuk (1920)
 I.I.Wrona (1924-1930)
 Benkovich (1934-?)
 V.N. Rykov (s. Of the.? -?)
 I. N. Stillman (1940-1944)
 V.Z. Boroday (1966-1973) [6]
 A.M. Lopukhov (1973-1985)
 V.N. Borisenko (1985-1988)
 A.V. Chebykin (1989 -...)
''On the efforts of Chebykin, in 1996 there was established the National Academy of Arts of Ukraine.

Alumni

Velerii Lamakh
Giennadij Jerszow
Stepan Nechai

References

Further reading
 Kyiv Art Institute // Українська Радянська Енциклопедія. — 2-е видання. — Т. 5. — К., 1980. — С. 151. (On Ukrainian)
 Національна академія образотворчого мистецтва і архітектури // Новий довідник для вступників до ВНЗ I, II, III, IV рівнів акредитації. — К.: Гранд-Ліцей, 2003. — С. 48.
 Павловський В. Українська Державна Академія Мистецтв до 50-літт.я її створення, ж. Нотатки з мистецтва, ч. 7. Филадельфия, 1968.
 Січинський В. Українська Академія Мистецтва (До 35-річчя її заснування);
 Art Institute // Київ: Енциклопедичний довідник. — К., 1981. — С. 672–673. (On Ukrainian)

External links
 Website of Academy
 History of Academy
 National Academy of Arts and Architecture at the Encyclopedia of Ukraine

Universities and colleges in Kyiv
Education in the Soviet Union
1917 establishments in Ukraine
Educational institutions established in 1917
 
National universities in Ukraine